Govt. City College Chittagong is a higher secondary and undergraduate level college in Chittagong, Bangladesh. It is located in Ice Factory Road (near New Market), 4000 Chittagong, in the Nalapara area of the city.

It was established in 1954. It offers HSC, honours and masters courses in different disciplines. It is affiliated with National University, Bangladesh.

Departments
 HSC
B.B.A(Honours),B.B.S(Pass),M.B.A
 Department of Accounting
 Department of Management

 B.Sc.(Honours), B.Sc. (Degree pass course) and M.Sc.
 Department of Physics
 Department of Chemistry
 Department of Mathematics
 Department of Botany
 Department of Zoology

B.Sc programs under National University(Honours)
 Physics
 Chemistry
 English
 Mathematics
 Psychology
 Botany
 Zoology

Admission requirement for HSC
 Science
(must have GPA 5.00)
 Business Studies
(must have GPA 4.00)
 Humanities
(must have GPA 3)
 Business Studies
(Evening Shift)
(must have GPA 4.00)
 Humanities (Evening Shift)
(must have GPA 3.5)

Advisory services
 Counseling service
 Tutorial Examination
 Attendance monitoring
 Vigilance team
 Teacher guardian meeting

Campus 
The campus accommodates four multi-storied academic buildings, a Shaheed Minar and a three storied mosque.

Notable alumni 
A. B. M. Mohiuddin Chowdhury - Bangladeshi Politician and Former Mayor of Chittagong
Dipak Barua - Bangladesh Sishu Sāhitya Ekademi Padak (2018) awarded children's author, poet

References

1954 establishments in East Pakistan
Public colleges in Chittagong
Colleges in Chittagong

Govt. Hazi Muhammad Mohsin College Chattogram